PNS Babur may refer to one of these ships of the Pakistan Navy:

 , the former , a Type 21 frigate of the Royal Navy launched in 1971; sold to Pakistan in 1993; decommissioned in 2014.
 PNS Babur (F-280), a PN MILGEM-class corvette of the Pakistan Navy launched in 2021.

Pakistan Navy ship names